Organisations referred to by the letters BUCE appear here:

 Belarusian Universal Commodity Exchange
 Birmingham City University